The 1970 South Dakota gubernatorial election was held on November 3, 1970.

Incumbent Republican Governor Frank Farrar was defeated by Democratic nominee Richard F. Kneip who won 54.85% of the vote.

Primary elections
Primary elections were held on June 2, 1970.

Democratic primary

Candidates
Richard F. Kneip, State Senator

Results

Republican primary

Candidates
Frank Farrar, incumbent Governor
Frank E. Henderson, State Senator

Results

General election

Candidates
Frank Farrar, Republican
Richard F. Kneip, Democratic

Results

References

Bibliography
 
 

1970
South Dakota
Gubernatorial
November 1970 events in the United States